Virginia Raffaele (born 27 September 1980) is an Italian comedian, actress, impersonator and presenter.

Life and career 

Raffaele started her career on stage, often working as a sidekick of the comedy duo Lillo & Greg. After her television debut as a correspondent in the Rai 2 program Quelli che... il Calcio, she became first known for her imitations and parodies in the Italia 1 show Mai dire Grande Fratello Show. She then appeared in several other shows, including Victor Victoria, Striscia la notizia, two episodes of Le invasioni barbariche and Amici. She also appeared as an actress in several films and TV-series.

After appearing as a guest at the 65th edition of the Sanremo Music Festival, Raffaele was chosen to co-host the 66th edition and host the 69th edition of the Festival.

Filmography

References

External links

 

1980 births
Living people
Actresses from Rome
Italian film actresses
Italian stage actresses
Italian television actresses
Italian women comedians
Italian television presenters
Italian women television presenters